The Roman Catholic Diocese of Jardim is a diocese located in the city of Jardim in the Ecclesiastical province of Campo Grande in Brazil.

History
 January 30, 1981: Established as Diocese of Jardim from the Diocese of Corumbá

Bishops
 Bishops of Jardim (Roman rite), in reverse chronological order
 Bishop João Gilberto de Moura (2013.09.29 - Present)
 Bishop Jorge Alves Bezerra, S.S.S. (2008.05.21 - 2012.11.07)
 Bishop Bruno Pedron, S.D.B. (1999.08.04 – 2007.04.11)
 Bishop Onofre Cândido Rosa, S.D.B. (1981.02.16 – 1999.08.04)

Coadjutor bishop
Bruno Pedron, S.D.B. (1999)

References
 GCatholic.org
 Catholic Hierarchy

Roman Catholic dioceses in Brazil
Christian organizations established in 1981
Jardim, Roman Catholic Diocese of
Roman Catholic dioceses and prelatures established in the 20th century